Prey is a  first-person shooter video game developed by Arkane Austin and published by Bethesda Softworks. It was released worldwide on 5 May 2017, for PlayStation 4, Windows, and Xbox One.

The game takes place in an alternate timeline in which an accelerated Space Race resulted in humankind taking to orbital stations far earlier. The player controls Morgan Yu while exploring the space station Talos I, in orbit around Earth–Moon L2, where they were part of a scientific team researching the Typhon, a hostile alien force composed of many forms with both physical and psychic powers, such as shapeshifting into a clone of any inanimate object. As the Typhon escape confinement, the player uses a variety of weapons and abilities, some of which are derived from the Typhon themselves, to avoid being killed while looking to escape the station. The player gains access to areas of the station by acquiring  key items and abilities, eventually allowing the player to explore the station in an open world setting. The game combines elements of role-playing video games, stealth games, immersive sims and Metroidvanias in its design.

Arkane's Prey is largely unrelated to the 2006 game Prey developed by Human Head Studios. While Prey 2, a sequel to the 2006 game, had been planned by Human Head, it fell into development hell following the transfer of the intellectual property from 3D Realms to Bethesda Softworks, and was eventually cancelled in 2014. Arkane's game does not use any of the planned sequel's assets, and only incorporates the previous game's name and the broad theme of the protagonist being hunted by aliens. Arkane built Prey as a spiritual sequel to System Shock, providing the player with several potential means of progressing within the game, while considering the Talos I station a thematic reinterpretation of their underground dungeon of their first game, Arx Fatalis.

Prey was positively reviewed by critics at release and considered one of the best games of 2017 by several gaming magazines and websites. Two expansions were released: Mooncrash, a procedurally-generated mode inspired by various roguelike games, and a multiplayer Typhon Hunter that incorporates the Typhon shapeshifting abilities in a hide-and-seek style game.

Gameplay
Prey is a first-person shooter with role-playing and stealth elements set in an open world environment. The player takes the role of Morgan Yu, a human aboard a space station with numerous species of hostile aliens known collectively as the Typhon. The player is able to select certain attributes of Morgan, including gender, and decisions made by the player that affects elements of the game's story. To survive, the player must collect and use weapons and resources aboard the station to fend off and defeat the Typhon. According to creative director Raphaël Colantonio, the station is completely continuous rather than having separate levels or missions, at times requiring the player to return to areas they previously explored. The player is able to venture outside of the station in space and find shortcuts connecting parts of the station. Colantonio stated that the aliens have an array of different powers that the player character can gain over time; one such alien has the ability to shape shift into everyday items, such as a chair. The player can acquire aliens' abilities by using a device called a  psychoscope. Recyclers can be used to break down almost any object into raw materials.

The game has multiple endings, according to lead designer Ricardo Bare; the endings fall into three major narrative structures depending on how the player broadly interacted with the station and surviving humans, but Bare said there are "tons of little permutations" based on specific events.

Mooncrash expansion
The Mooncrash expansion, released in June 2018, is a separate game mode built atop the setting and gameplay of the base Prey game. It is a roguelike mode in which, while the levels of the expansion remains the same, placement of enemies, weapons, and other items are randomized on each playthrough.

Narratively, the player takes the role of Peter, a hacker aboard a satellite orbiting the Moon, forced by his employer the Kasma Corporation to figure out what happened at the Pytheas Moonbase. Peter does this by running through simulations, in which he takes the place of one of five known survivors of the attack. The player, as Peter, must figure out how each of the five survived through the five various escape routes. This is presented by leading one character through the station, fighting off the Typhon, collecting equipment, hacking terminals, and other actions. If the player can lead that character to safety, they then must lead the other characters, one at a time, through the same gameworld to find a different escape point, with all of the changes on the gameworld from the previous characters still in place. Players may reset the simulation, randomizing the world elements and effectively starting a new run. However, the player gains credits that they can use within the simulation to improve how any of the character start, such as with better weapons or additional health packs, and they can permanently unlock skills for each character within future simulation runs by collecting certain objects within the gameworld.

Typhon Hunter expansion
The Typhon Hunter expansion contains two game modes. One is designed as a single-player virtual reality experience, challenging the player to various escape room scenarios aboard the Talos I station. The second is an asymmetrical multiplayer mode for up to six players. One plays as Morgan while the others are Mimic Typhons, which can disguise themselves as nearly any object within the game's environment. The player as Morgan is challenged to find and kill all the other players within a limited amount of time, while the Mimic players can rearrange items in rooms, disguise themselves, and when the Morgan player is close, jump out and attack them before seeking another hiding place.

Plot

Setting
Prey takes place in an alternate timeline where the Soviet Union encounters a species of eusocial aliens, called the Typhon, aboard one of their satellites, the Vorona 1. The Soviet Union works together with the United States to fight off and capture the aliens, unbeknownst to the general population. Together, they build the space station Kletka (Russian for "cell") to be used as a prison for the Typhon situated in orbit around the Moon. After a failed assassination attempt on United States President John F. Kennedy, the United States wrests full control of the Kletka satellite from the Soviet Union. Research of the Typhon continues under the name "Project Axiom". After the "Pobeg Incident" in 1980 where some scientists aboard the station lost their lives to the Typhon, the American government shutters Project Axiom, leaving the captive Typhon alive.

By 2025, the newly founded TranStar Corporation acquires Kletka and by 2030, has refitted it as Talos I, a fully operational research laboratory to study the Typhon and develop advances in neuroscience; this leads to the creation of Neuromods that harness the Typhon's physiology to restructure the human brain to grant the user new abilities, including superhuman ones. TranStar grows financially successful from sales of Neuromods on Earth. At the time of the game's setting, about 2035, TranStar has further expanded the station to make for suitable living quarters for its staff that spend up to two years on the station between regular shuttles to Earth.

Because of the numerous agencies that operated and expanded Talos I over the decades, the station includes a large mix of architectural designs, ranging from retrofuturism that was popular in 1960s America, to brutalist styles that were common in the Soviet Bloc in the mid-20th century, to opulent Art Deco put in place by the wealthy TranStar executives.

Synopsis
In March 2032, Morgan Yu is recruited by their brother Alex to join TranStar's research team on Talos I. Prior to leaving for the station and while taking a series of tests including the Trolley problem and the Rorschach test, one of the supervising doctors is attacked by a Typhon and Morgan is knocked out. Morgan wakes up in their apartment, but finds out that it is a simulated environment. It is 2035 and Morgan has been living on Talos I for three years. Morgan is contacted by January, an Operator artificial intelligence that claims to have been built by Morgan. January warns Morgan that the Typhon have broken containment and taken over the station, killing the majority of the crew. It reveals to Morgan that they had been testing neuromods for the past three years, with Morgan continually adding and removing them. While these neuromods allow for instantaneous learning of complex skills and abilities, a side effect of removing a neuromod is that the user loses all memories gained after installation of that neuromod, explaining Morgan's memory loss. January claims that Morgan built it to help destroy Talos I, taking the Typhon and all of its research with it. Alex contacts Morgan and suggests instead building a special Nullwave device that will destroy the Typhon but leave the station intact, citing how their research is too valuable to lose.

Morgan travels through the station and encounters other survivors, with a choice of whether to help them or not. Alex tasks Morgan with scanning the Typhon "Coral" growing around the station, and discovers that the Typhon are building some sort of neural network. Their attempts to study the neural network are interrupted when the TranStar Board of Directors learns of the containment breach and sends a cleanup crew to eliminate both the Typhon and any surviving station crew. After the cleanup crew is dealt with, Alex further analyzes the data and concludes that the Typhon are sending a signal into deep space to summon something. A gargantuan Typhon called Apex appears and begins to devour Talos I. Morgan is given the choice of activating the station's self-destruct sequence or building the Nullwave device to defeat the Typhon.

If Morgan chooses to activate the Nullwave device, all of the Typhon on Talos I are destroyed and the station is left intact to allow further neuromod research. If Morgan chooses to activate the self-destruct, the entire station explodes, destroying all of the Typhon with it. Morgan either finds a way to escape the station or is stranded and dies in the explosion, based on earlier choices in the game.

In a post-credits scene, Morgan wakes up in a lab and learns that it is not the real Morgan, but instead a captured Typhon implanted with Morgan's memories in an effort to teach it human emotions and empathy. The Typhon have invaded Earth; Alex and his Operator assistants judge "Morgan" based on the choices it made throughout the game. If "Morgan" failed to show human empathy, Alex destroys it and starts the experiment over. If "Morgan" did show human empathy, Alex lets it go, whereupon it can choose to accept his offer to bring peace between the Typhon and humanity, or kill him.

Mooncrash
In 2036, Peter is stationed in a remote satellite orbiting the Moon and is forced under contract by the Kasma Corporation, a rival to TranStar, to undergo numerous simulations reliving a Typhon outbreak on Transtar's Pytheas Moon Base. As he completes his assigned tasks, his handler Basilisk warns him that Kasma will betray him once his mission is complete and helps him make preparations to escape. When Peter fulfills his contract, Kasma congratulates him but claims that due to tight budgets, they cannot retrieve him from the satellite and shut off its life support. With help from Basilisk, Peter overrides the satellite's controls and crashes it near the real Pytheas facility, where he commandeers a shuttle and returns to Earth. In a post-credits scene, it is revealed that a Mimic has stowed away on Peter's shuttle.

Development

Intellectual property transition 

The success of the original Prey led to the announcement of a sequel Prey 2 in August 2006, with continued development by 3D Realms. However, the project faced a number of issues, including the transfer of the intellectual property (IP) rights to Bethesda Softworks (under ZeniMax Media) sometime by 2011. In March 2011, Bethesda announced that Prey 2 would instead be developed by Human Head Studios using a modified id Tech 4 engine.

On 31 May 2013, Kotaku reported rumors that development had moved to Arkane Studios and that the development had been rebooted, scrapping all of Human Head Studios' work on Prey 2 with a targeted release of 2016. After about a year of further rumors, Bethesda cancelled Prey 2. Arkane had started working on a Prey game that would be considered a reboot rather than a sequel, using none of the Prey concepts and none of Human Head's previous development.

On 12 June 2016, Bethesda announced the Prey reboot at its E3 press conference. The game's development was led by Arkane Studios CEO and director Raphaël Colantonio and his team in Austin, Texas. The new Prey is not a true sequel but instead "a re-imagining of the IP", according to Colantonio. The teaser trailer shown during E3 2016 showed the game's protagonist in something like "a space horror version of Groundhog Day", according to CNet's Seamus Byrne. Bethesda's vice president of marketing Pete Hines explained that the new game has no elements from the cancelled Prey 2 outside of the player facing against aliens. Colantonio said in later interviews that calling their game Prey was a "non negotiable compromise" with Bethesda, a decision that no one on the Arkane team was pleased with. Colantonio said it felt bad to lie that they were continuing the Prey series, and was an insult to Human Head, the developers of the original Prey.  He expressed that it was a "sales mistake" that would turn away fans of the original Prey and fail to attract other players.

Gameplay design 
Prey came out of Arkane Studios' own ideas; as explained by Colantonio, after they finished Dishonored, roughly around 2014, they split their team to work on two projects, one being Dishonored 2 and the other a new intellectual property based on similar gameplay ideas which would be "in first-person, with depth and simulation and narration". According to lead designer Ricardo Bare, Colantonio had suggested they look back towards what they had done with Arx Fatalis, a fantasy title produced by Arkane in 2002 which featured "this big, inter-connected dungeon that the player could roam so long as they could unlock everything". They took this "mega-dungeon" concept, but set it as a space station filled with hostile aliens, and would require the player to consider the "full ecology" of the game's world to overcome obstacles. They did not want the player to solve singular-solution puzzles, such as simply finding a key for a locked door, but instead "think of this as a living, dynamic world, where there are tons of solutions possible", according to Bare.

As Arkane started developing this concept, they recognized the similarities to the original Prey. Realizing that coming up with a name for a new property can be difficult, and that through Bethesda that they would have the ability to use that name, they opted to go with calling the game Prey. Hines explained that Arkane evaluated the Prey property to its core and built up a new game around it, calling it more a psychological game rather than a horror one.

According to design documents from early in the project's history published by Kotaku, the game was developed at Arkane under the name "Project Danielle". Three different concepts had been presented, all based on the nature of System Shock and involving the player-character named Danielle Sho (considered by Kotaku as a reference to SHODAN from System Shock) to find that there was a false reality in their apparent world and dealing with an artificial intelligence that has a significant influence on events; these settings included a futuristic lab set on Earth set just prior to the System Shock time frame, a secret lab on a remote island, and a retro-futuristic setting. Kotaku observed that this final setting was closest to what the released Prey looked like.

Prey incorporates numerous gameplay concepts from Dishonored, which was itself inspired by the Looking Glass Studios' games Thief: The Dark Project and System Shock, where players are encouraged to find creative solutions to overcoming obstacles. Borrowed elements from Dishonored include giving the player enough agency to determine how they want to proceed at the game, having in-game consequences for certain actions taken by the player, developing a game world based on a pre-established lore that can be learned by examining notes and computer terminals throughout the station, and a simple user-interface. However, Colantonio said that Prey would be less focused on stealth as Dishonored was, and would provide a more role-playing video game-style improvement system through in-game chipsets that allows the player to customize their abilities for more tactical fast-paced action sequences in contrast to Dishonoreds bone charm system. While Prey has been likened to a Metroidvania, its lead designer Ricardo Bare has said that he actually was not familiar with the sub-genre and that Preys world design follows in the footsteps of games such as Arkane's own Arx Fatalis and Looking Glass Studios' System Shock, which featured interconnected worlds where to make progress, obstacles had been overcome through abilities the player could acquire. Bare considered the Talos I setting to be "like an open world" that is fully explorable as the player gained abilities and equipment. However, according to Colantonio, calling it an open world "might have the wrong associations." The developers also took inspiration from FTL: Faster Than Light, considering the complexities of the various gameplay systems and how fast that a situation can go wrong if the player did not sufficiently plan ahead. Bare said they wanted to include that "chaos of systems", and keeping in mind that Talos I is a functioning space station, populated the station with a number of hazards like gas pipes and oil spills that can both been a boon to the players in defeating the Typhon, but also can cause unforeseen consequences if the player is not careful. Arkane had considered including procedural generation within the main campaign, so that different areas may have different hazards when the player encountered them, but they recognized that this would become a point of frustration for a single-player game that may caused players to leave the game uncompleted. They dropped this approach, and instead worked the procedural generation aspects into the game's downloadable content Mooncrash, which takes place outside the main game's campaign.

Emergent gameplay was a goal of Arkane: while they had given the players abilities to take on Prey in a full action mode or full stealth mode, they wanted players to find a way to complete the game in their own manner. They recognized players may take one specific set of skills and weapons, and avoided including any enemies or obstacles that would be impossible to surpass because they did not specialize in the right skills, providing a means to bypass such areas. Arkane restricted how many horror elements they would include, since they could not predict where the player's attention would be throughout the game, providing another reason why they opted not to consider Prey a horror game. Some elements supporting emergent gameplay arose during testing of the game's various systems. One of the Typhon aliens, the Mimic, was inspired by the creature of the same name from Dungeons & Dragons, and was programmed to take the form of any object smaller than itself in the room, avoiding the use of scripted events and allowing the alien's artificial intelligence in the game's software decide what to replicate. Separately, one of the tools developed by Arkane was the psychoscope, which allows players to scan an alien and learn and then use its powers; when the programmers learned of this, they quickly found that having players be able to copy the Mimic's power created a depth of new gameplay options, such as taking the form of a small object to sneak into small places, or taking the form of a non-flammable object to roll through fire-laden areas. Enabling emergent gameplay in Prey allowed for speedrunners to take advantage of the game's tools, particularly the Gloo Cannon that is able to create platforms on surfaces to access areas Arkane did not intend to be accessed without other tools.

Story and art 

The narrative concept for Prey came to Colantonio during one of his airline flights while on travel; on return, he started to engage with the Austin studio to flesh out the ideas for the narrative, design, and gameplay, looking to build as detailed a world as they had for the city of Dunwall used as the setting for Dishonored. Colantonio said that it took about a year from this initial concept to come up with setting the game in an alternate timeline that helped support this detailing. They considered how the future would have been different if Kennedy survived the assassination attempt, allowing them to flesh out the narrative and design of the space station. This itself directly attributed to the styles used in the various parts of the station, with the team considering what architecture would have influenced those most responsible for operating Talos I at the time. This ranged from considering what Kennedy would have seen frequently were he alive in the 1960s and 1970s, to envision how those funding contemporary commercial space efforts like Elon Musk or Google would style a space station. As Talos I is a relatively small space, Arkane was able to detail the station in depth, such as naming each non-playable character, including those already dead by the story's present, and fleshing out background stories for them, as to make the game's world more cohesive.

The narrative directed them to the types of weapons that would be available to the player. Arkane recognized that as a research station, their security forces would only likely have common weapons, such as pistols and shotguns, and would not have the equivalent of super-powerful gear like Dooms BFG. What advanced weapons are available were designed to look like prototypes and have flaws associated with them being only in their testing phase.

Arkane's Harvey Smith is credited with establishing the Typhon and the reason for their existence in the story. The player as Morgan follows in the threat's wake, finding survivors that have no idea what just happened but need their help. Arkane wanted a more unique design to the aliens, and opted to use designs inspired by paranormal elements rather than stereotypical insect- or lizard-like species.

Austin Grossman, also of Arkane, helped with establishing the early plot details with Morgan's awakening at the start of the game. Bare had reached out to Chris Avellone circa 2013 to gain his help with the story, though at the time, Avellone was committed to other projects but wanted to work with the studio. Once Avellone was able to, he contacted Arkane to offer his help on the narrative. Besides other parts of the narrative, Avellone was responsible for designing the non-player characters and the various missions that would involve these characters. Avellone felt these characters and their missions created dilemmas for the player to determine how to proceed, helping the player to define their version of Morgan as well as expanding on the game's universe. Avellone worked with Arkane on the story from June to about November 2016.

Among other works, Prey was influenced by the films Moon, Starship Troopers, and The Matrix. As part of the game's promotion, Bethesda partnered with the Alamo Drafthouse to show these three films during April 2017. Avellone also cited Aliens as part of his inspiration, describing it as an action-suspense film which has moments of comedy, even in the midst of heavy action sequences, and something he reused in writing for Prey.

The original score was composed and produced by Mick Gordon, who had previously composed the soundtrack for Doom. Additional music was composed by Ben Crossbones, Matt Piersall, and Colantonio, with each one providing a single track. The soundtrack was released for live-streaming music services a week before the game's release.

Technical development 
Prior to Prey, Arkane had just released Dishonored 2 which used the studio's internally developed Void game engine. At release, many players reported performance issues with the Windows version of the game, which Arkane fixed through patches, but led to some lingering doubts as to Arkane's ability to develop for the Windows platform. Colantonio said that Arkane wanted to remove that stigma for Prey, with the goal to produce a "really flawless" version for Windows on release. The game was developed using CryEngine 4, an established third-party game engine, eliminating many issues related to performance. Colantonio said that they "doubled our thoroughness" in the areas of quality assurance testing to eliminate other possible issues.

Expansions 
During the Electronic Entertainment Expo 2018, Bethesda announced a free update released on June 9, 2018 that added two new game modes to Prey, including a New Game Plus mode, and a Survival mode that adds modifiers, such as weapon durability, that make it more difficult. Bethesda announced the game's first downloadable content, Mooncrash, which is a procedurally generated adventure that was available that day. They announced plans to release a multiplayer Typhon Hunt mode, where some players play as Typhon Mimics that can disguise themselves. The Typhon Hunt mode was inspired by the "Prop Hunt" mode that came about from Garry's Mod; as Arkane started to show initial details of the main game, including the Mimic enemies, players responded that they were reminded of "Prop Hunt". Bare had not been aware of what that was, but after researching it, felt it was ideal for a multiplayer extension of Prey. Both Mooncrash and Typhon Hunt were modes prototyped within an internal game jam following the release of Prey, looking to see how they could easily extend the game.

The Mooncrash expansion was further updated in September 2018 with a free patch that provided in-game customization skins that celebrated the team's favorite roguelike games, which included Spelunky, Rogue Legacy, Risk of Rain, Don't Starve, Darkest Dungeon, and Dead Cells.

The Typhon Hunter mode was released on December 11, 2018, along with a virtual reality-based escape the room set of puzzles set before the events of Prey.

Release and marketing
Prey was released on 5 May 2017. Arkane and Bethesda provided a game demo for PlayStation 4 and Xbox One consoles about a week before the game's launch, covering about the first hour of gameplay. The studio did not opt to provide a demo for Windows systems, citing that they had to choose between either the consoles or personal computer for demo release. Colantonio said that with the game's release through Steam, interested players can try the game for up to two hours under Steam's return policy, effectively treating this the equivalent of a demo.  Regardless of this, the Steam version eventually received one.

Technical issues
On release, PCGamesN reported that the Windows version of Prey lacked those technical issues that has troubled Dishonored 2, and called the game "the best performing triple-A game" they had seen in several months. Eurogamers Digital Foundry found the computer version of Prey to run exceedingly well across even low-end computers, in contrast to problems it saw for Dishonored 2 at release.

However, some reviewers and players found that after several hours of playing on the computer version, their saved games would become corrupted, and the game would crash when transitioning between areas once this started to occur. Restoring from older saves would eventually cause those to be corrupted as well, making the game impossible to complete. Bethesda reported it planned to release a patch to fix this issue in the week following the game's release.

Trademark dispute
Just prior to release, No Matter Studios, the developers of an upcoming video game Prey for the Gods, announced that, due to trademark objections from ZeniMax Media, they had to change the name of their game to Praey for the Gods. ZeniMax reported that they had to defend the Prey trademark to avoid losing it in taking objection to No Matter's trademark filing.

Reception

Critical reception 

Prey received "generally favorable" reviews from critics, according to review aggregator Metacritic.

Critics praised the fully realized atmosphere of Talos I, with some labeling it a "luxurious sci-fi playground". On the other hand, combat proved divisive. GameSpots Tamoor Hussain found fight sequences "rewarding", while IGNs Dan Stapleton considered combat Preys "biggest weakness" partly due to periods of AI unresponsiveness. Concerning the story, GameSpot found protagonist Morgan Yu's journey somewhat "thin", and TrustedReviews called the storyline "lacking". Eurogamer ranked the game 12th on their list of the "Top 50 Games of 2017", GamesRadar+ ranked it 11th on their list of the 25 Best Games of 2017, and Polygon ranked it seventh on their list of the 50 best games of 2017, while EGMNow ranked it ninth on their list of the 25 Best Games of 2017. It was nominated for "Best Setting" in PC Gamers 2017 Game of the Year Awards, for "Best Xbox One Game" in Destructoids Game of the Year Awards 2017, and for "Best Shooter" in IGNs Best of 2017 Awards.

The game was praised by several critics and journalists for having an Asian protagonist.

Sales 
Prey debuted at No. 2 on the weekly sales charts in the United Kingdom, trailing the Nintendo Switch port of Mario Kart 8. These figures were considered disappointing due to a lack of competition from AAA new releases and the fact that the opening week sales were 60% down from Arkane's previous title, Dishonored 2. Additionally, Bethesda's decision to hold review copies until the release date was mentioned by outlets as a factor for the weak launch.

Prey captured the top spot in its second week of release, besting Mario Kart 8 Deluxe, a rise partially attributed to the positive reception the game received from critics, though sales were down 32% from its debut week. In doing so, Prey became the first Bethesda game since 2016's Doom to reach number one on the United Kingdom weekly sales charts.

In Japan, Prey debuted at No. 5 on the weekly sales charts when it released in late May with 7,105 copies sold for the PlayStation 4. The Xbox One version did not make the charts.

Accolades

References

External links
 
 Prey at MobyGames

2017 video games
Alien abduction in video games
Alien invasions in video games
Alternate history video games
Arkane Studios games
Bethesda Softworks games
First-person shooters
Immersive sims
Metroidvania games
Multiplayer and single-player video games
Open-world video games
PlayStation 4 games
PlayStation 4 Pro enhanced games
Retrofuturistic video games
Science fiction video games
Video game reboots
Video games developed in the United States
Video games featuring protagonists of selectable gender
Video games scored by Mick Gordon
Video games set in the 2030s
Video games set in outer space
Video games set on the Moon
Video games with alternate endings
Windows games
Xbox Cloud Gaming games
Xbox One games
ZeniMax Media franchises